Crispino e la comare o Il medico e la morte (The Cobbler and the Fairy or The Doctor and Death) is an opera written collaboratively by Luigi Ricci and Federico Ricci with an Italian libretto by Francesco Maria Piave.

Performance history
The premiere took place on 28 February 1850 at the Teatro San Benedetto in Venice.

The work was very popular during the 19th century, and was a favourite of Italian touring companies in the Americas, and in the Asia-Pacific region.

It had its London premiere on 17 November 1857 at St James's Theatre. It was first performed in Paris on 4 April 1865 in Italian by the Théâtre Italien and was performed on 18 September 1869 as Le Docteur Crispin, with a French translation by Charles Nuitter and Alexandre Beaumont, at the Théâtre de l'Athénée on the rue Scribe. Its Calcutta premiere was in 1867 at the Calcutta Opera House, and its Australian premiere was on 11 August 1871 at the Princess Theatre (Melbourne).

Though it was rarely performed in the 20th century, the Festival della Valle d'Itria in Martina Franca, Italy staged the work as part of its 39th opera festival in July 2013.  Bass-baritone Domenico Colaianni sang Crispino, while the role of Annetta was taken by Stefania Bonfadelli.

Roles

Synopsis
Place: Venice
Time: the 17th century

Crispino is a poor cobbler who cannot make ends meet. He is helped by a fairy who encourages him to start practicing medicine, though he cannot even read. He is successful with the fairy's help but cannot bear prosperity gracefully and mistreats his wife. The fairy makes him aware of his faults and the cobbler's family is happily reunited.

Recordings
1938: An Italian film based on the opera was directed by Vincenzo Sorelli.
1974: Complete recording, RAI orchestra & chorus, conductor Marco della Chiesa; Mario Chiappi (Crispino), Emilia Raveglia (Annetta), Luisella Ciaffi-Ricagno, Gianfranco Pastine, Alesandro Corbelli & Angelo Nostri. MRF Records, private edition.
1994: A complete recording was made by the San Remo Symphonic Orchestra.
 2015: A DVD recorded live at the 2013 Festival della Valle d'Itria was released by Dynamic with Domenico Colaianni as Crispino and Stefania Bonfadelli as Annetta; Chorus of the Teatro Petruzzelli di Bari; Orchestra Internazionale d'Italia; Jader Bignamini (conductor)

References
Notes

Sources
 Lecomte, Louis-Henry (1912). Histoire des théâtres de Paris: Les Fantaisies-Parisiennes, l'Athénée Le Théâtre Scribe, l'Athénée-Comique (1865–1911). Paris: H. Daragon. Copy at the Internet Archive.
 Loewenberg, Alfred (1978). Annals of Opera 1597–1940 (third edition, revised). Totowa, New Jersey: Rowman and Littlefield. .

Further reading
 Warrack, John and Ewan West, The Oxford Dictionary of Opera, 1992,

External links

 Vocal score of Le Docteur Crispin at the Internet Archive

Italian-language operas
Operas by Luigi Ricci
Operas by Federico Ricci
Operas by multiple composers
Operas
Opera buffa
1850 operas
Operas set in Venice
Fiction about shoemakers
Fictional fairies and sprites